Gianpietro Marchetti (born 22 October 1948) is a retired Italian professional footballer who played as a defender.

Honours
Juventus
 Serie A champion: 1971–72, 1972–73.

External links
 

1948 births
Living people
Italian footballers
Italy international footballers
Serie A players
Atalanta B.C. players
Juventus F.C. players
Calcio Lecco 1912 players
U.S. Catanzaro 1929 players
Association football defenders